Ebrahim A. Juffali and Brothers is Saudi Arabia's largest private enterprise. Founded in 1946, its expansion coincided with the country's growth, and by the mid 1970s, the Juffali Group had firmly established itself as the largest business house in the Middle East, with 49,218 employees worldwide.

Juffali was responsible for developing the first power generation (electricity), and telecommunication in Saudi Arabia as-well as television concessions. Later on the Al Juffali group introduced many other fields to Saudi Arabia such as power utilities, construction, insurance, telecommunications, and vehicle manufacturing and distribution.

The group's growth was steered in large part by Sheikh Ahmed bin Abdullah Al-Juffali (1924–1994). The company was later run by his sons, Sheikh Khaled Juffali and Sheikh Walid Al Juffali (1955-2016) and supported by professional staff managing a wide range of investments, manufacturing, finance, real estate, distribution, and oil drilling throughout the Middle East, Europe, Asia, and North America.

Subsidiaries 
The following companies are subsidiaries of Juffali Group:

 Arabian Metal Industries Co.
 Saudi Refrigerators Manufacturing Co.
 Juffali Air Ducts and Accessories Plant
 Gulf Acrylic Manufacturing Co.
 Juffali Low Tension Factory
 Juffali Tyres Retreading Factory
 National Automobile Industry Co.
 Saudi Tractors Manufacturing Co.
 Saudi Building Systems Manufacturing Co.
 Saudi Air-conditioning Manufacturing Co.
 Arabian Chemical Company (Polystyrene)
 Arabian Chemical Company “Latex”
 Juffali Automotive Company(JACO)

International partners 
The following companies are international partners of Juffali Group:

 Kelvinator
 Liebherr
 Raychem
 Fluor Corporation
 Nabors Industries
 Daimler AG
 Electrolux
 Massey Ferguson
 Siemens
 Mercedes-Benz
 Heidelberger
 Michelin
 Bosch
 Ericsson
 IBM
 Dow Chemical Company
 DuPont
 Liebherr
 Carrier Global
 Kärcher
 Frigidaire
 Butler

References

External links
 

1948 establishments in Saudi Arabia
Conglomerate companies established in 1948
Companies of Saudi Arabia
Companies based in Jeddah
Juffali family
Saudi Arabian families
Telecommunications companies established in 1948
Energy companies established in 1948